The BPM-97 (Boyevaya Pogranichnaya Mashina - "Battle Vehicle of the Border Guard") or Выстрел (en. Gunshot) is the Russian military designation for the KAMAZ 43269 Vystrel 4×4 wheeled mine-resistant, ambush protected (MRAP) vehicle. It is produced fitted with several different turrets like the one of the BTR-80A. The vehicle is based on the KAMAZ-43269 and was designed for the Russian Border Guards. The latest model has bulletproof side windows and no gun turret. It has been ordered by Kazakhstan and by the National Guard of Russia, the Federal Prison Service  and EMERCOM.

History
Development began in 1997. The new armored vehicle was meant to replace the border guards' main transport, the GAZ-66. After a government funding default in 1998, the much delayed public funding of the project was stopped. In order to offset the cost of the development in the absence of government orders, machines were allowed to be sold to civilian companies.

The armored vehicle was used for the transportation of explosives, money and valuable goods. After receiving permission in 2005, some cars were sold to the Ministry of Internal Affairs of Kazakhstan and Azerbaijan. Production of the "Vystrel" is ongoing at the  JSC "Remdizel" plant  in Naberezhnye Chelny, where the armoured body and KAMAZ 4326 truck chassis are integrated.

The armored car "Shot" entered service with the Russian Defense Ministry in 2009. Antiterrorist units of all divisions of the Strategic Missile Forces are equipped with "KAMAZ-43269" armored vehicles  as of 2013.

In 2015 several BPM-97 were used in War in Donbas where at least 3 of them were destroyed in February 2015.

Description
The hull is made of welded aluminium alloy. The upper part of the vehicle's armored body withstands hits from a 12.7×108mm - NSV machine gun at a distance of 300 metres. The lower part protects against 7.62×54mmR SVD rifles at a distance of 30 m.

The vehicle is divided into the engine compartment and separate crew areas. The body has side and rear doors, and roof hatches for exiting.

The base vehicle is the KAMAZ 4326 4×4 truck.

Armament
Armament varies. The BPM-97 is available with a pintle mounted or turret mounted 7.62 mm, 12.7 mm machine guns such as the Kord 12.7mm, 14.5 mm KPV heavy machine guns as in a BTR-80 type turret, or a combination uninhabited turret fitted with a sighting device with 30 mm rapid-fire cannon and 30 mm AGS-30 automatic grenade launchers launched into serial production in May 2022.

Variants
 BPM-97 – Modification for the border troops.
 KAMAZ-43269 "Dozor" – BRM modification for the Army.
 KAMAZ-43269 "Vystrel" (The Shot) – upgraded with a modified armored windshield wipers, transferred air intake and an air purification system, introduced during the 2011 exhibition of military vehicles at the Bronnitsy test range.

Versions
In 2008, KamAZ planned to create a similar three-and four-axle vehicle designed for 13 and 18 men, respectively.

In 2009, vif2ne.ru published photographs of 3 and 4-axle armored vehicles similar to the "Shot" design. Later, photographs appeared of a triaxial armored car, presumably called "Item 69501".

In 2010, the JSC "Krasnodar Instrument Factory Cascade" announced the "15M107" machine based upon the KAMAZ-43269 "The Shot". It is intended for remote search and the clearance of minefields, having in its composition electronic administration circuits.

JSC Zashchita (Protection) Company produces the SBA-60K2 "Bulat", an enlarged 6×6 version of the BPM-97, based on components of the KAMAZ 6×6.

Operators

Current operators
  ( Three in War in Donbas 2015 destroyed in February 2015.)
 
 
 
  (Two BPM-97 captured from Russian forces during the 2022 Russian invasion of Ukraine)

Gallery

See also
Bulat (APC)
Didgori-2
BTR-40 - a similar 4×4 Russian wheeled armored vehicle

Notes

External links

 Official Kurganmash website (Russian)
 Official Remidzel Factory site (Russian)
 Protection СБА-60К2 «БУЛАТ» (SBA-60K2 Bulat), a larger version based on the KAMAZ 5350 6x6
 Article at Legion
 KAMAZ-43269 Vistrel walkaround
 Upgraded KAMAZ-43269 Vistrel walkaround

Kamaz
Reconnaissance vehicles
Off-road vehicles
Armoured personnel carriers of Russia
Cars of Russia
Military vehicles introduced in the 1990s